This is a list of Irish military personnel of the Defence Forces who have died while serving overseas.

Since the 1960s, 88 personnel (87 from the Irish Army and one from the Air Corps) have died in overseas deployments.

Fatalities have primarily occurred as part of United Nations peacekeeping missions, with 26 lives lost in the Congo under ONUC; 9 in Cyprus under UNFICYP; two in the Middle East under UNTSO; 47 in Lebanon under UNIFIL; one in East Timor under UNTAET; one in Liberia under UNMIL and two in Europe under the EU Nordic Battlegroup and EUMS.

Irish Defence Forces Roll of Honour

Fatalities by mission

See also
 List of Gardaí killed in the line of duty

Notes

References

Casualties overseas
Casualties overseas
Military casualties overseas
Irish Defence Forces
Military casualties overseas